The Pelgorskoye peat railway
is located in Leningrad Oblast, Russia. The railway operates year-round.

Current status 
The Pelgorskoye peat railway's first line was constructed in  1950s, in the Tosnensky District, Leningrad Oblast, from the Ryabovo village to the swamp peat fields. The railway was built for hauling milling peat and workers and operates year-round. In 2001 the Pelgorskoe-M Peat Company started replacing equipment and repairing the railway between the mine and the processing facilities. A peat factory was built and put into operation in 2004. In 2016, repairs were made to the track.

Rolling stock

Locomotives 
TU6A – № 1650, 1903
TU8G – № 0015
ESU2A – № 607
TD-5U

Railroad car
 Flatcar
 Tank car
 Tank car – fire train
 Passenger car PV40
 Open wagon for peat TSV6A
 Hopper car to transport track ballast

Work trains 
Snowplow PS-1
Track laying cranes PPR2ma – № 275

See also
 Narrow-gauge railways in Russia
 Gladkoye narrow-gauge railway
 Laryan narrow-gauge railway

References and sources

External links

  Official Website 
 Photo – project «Steam Engine» 
 «The site of the railroad» S. Bolashenko 
750 mm gauge railways in Russia
Rail transport in Leningrad Oblast